Hoplia callipyge is a species of scarab beetle in the family Scarabaeidae. It is found in Central America and North America. Adults are about a quarter inch long, oval, and brown. The beetles are active March through May and are noted for feeding on the petals of light-colored roses. However they will also feed on other flowers and the young leaves and fruit of certain plants. Larvae hatch from white eggs in soil and feed on roots and decaying plants.

References

Further reading

 
 

Melolonthinae
Articles created by Qbugbot
Beetles described in 1856